Departmental elections to elect the membership of the Departmental Councils of France's 100 departments were held on 20 and 27 June 2021.

It was delayed by three months due to the COVID-19 pandemic in France.

Results of councils

References 

Elections postponed due to the COVID-19 pandemic
French cantonal elections
2021 elections in France
June 2021 events in France